Tai Le is a Unicode block containing characters for writing the Tai Le language.

History
The following Unicode-related documents record the purpose and process of defining specific characters in the Tai Le block:

References 

Unicode blocks